White Oak Township is a township in Harrison County, in the U.S. state of Missouri.

White Oak Township takes its name from White Oak Creek.

References

Townships in Missouri
Townships in Harrison County, Missouri